Comilla-10 is a constituency represented in the Jatiya Sangsad (National Parliament) of Bangladesh since 2008 by Mustafa Kamal of the Awami League.

Boundaries 
The constituency encompasses Comilla Sadar Dakshin, Lalmai, and Nangalkot upazilas.

History 
The constituency was created for the first general elections in newly independent Bangladesh, held in 1973.

Ahead of the 2014 general election, the Election Commission expanded the boundaries of the constituency to include all of Comilla Sadar Dakshin Upazila. Previously it had excluded Comilla Dakshin Municipality and the upazila's six northernmost union parishads: Bara Para, Bijoypur, Chouara, Galiara, Purba Jorekaran, and Paschim Jorekaran.

Ahead of the 2018 general election, the Election Commission expanded the boundaries of the constituency by adding Lalmai Upazila, which had been created in 2017 from union parishads of Comilla Sadar Upazila and Laksam Upazila.

Members of Parliament

Elections

Elections in the 2010s 
Mustafa Kamal was re-elected unopposed in the 2014 general election after opposition parties withdrew their candidacies in a boycott of the election.

Elections in the 2000s

Elections in the 1990s

References

External links
 

Parliamentary constituencies in Bangladesh
Cumilla District